The 1905–06 Yale Bulldogs men's ice hockey season was the 11th season of play for the program.

Season
Yale was one of the strongest teams in college hockey, stopping fellow collegiate team from scoring in five of their eight games. Unfortunately, the Elis still could not overcome their rivals from Harvard. Yale pushed the Crimson into overtime in their final game but Harvard managed to win its seventh consecutive match against the Bulldogs.

The team did not have a coach, however, C. Buchanan Stuart served as team manager.

Roster

Standings

Schedule and Results

|-
!colspan=12 style="color:white; background:#00356B" | Regular Season

† Brown records the score of the game as 3–1 for Yale.

References

Yale Bulldogs men's ice hockey seasons
Yale
Yale
Yale
Yale